Francesco Demuro (born 6 January 1978), is an Italian operatic tenor. He was born in Porto Torres, Sardinia. By the age of ten, Demuro made his first stage appearance, and by the age of twelve, he had joined the Minicantadores, a group of young singers of traditional Sardinian songs in the genre known as cantu a chiterra of which  he became  a leading representative.

He later studied in Cagliari under Elisabetta Scano, and made his opera debut in the role of Rodolfo in Verdi's Luisa Miller at the Teatro Regio in Parma in October 2007.  Currently, he lives in Lucca, with his wife Vittoria Contini and their daughters. At the same time, he retains his strong connection to Sardinia, where he spends holidays and performs Sardinian folk songs in popular festivals.

Career highlights
In 2008 he appeared as the Duke of Mantua in Rigoletto at the "Verdi Festival" in Parma, as well as in Dresden, Hong Kong, at the Teatro Regio in Turin, in Simon Boccanegra in Athens, and in La bohème in Bari and Sassari.

In 2009, he made his debut as Nemorino in L'elisir d'amore in Teatro Filarmonico di Verona and also appeared in the opera at La Scala in Milan the following year.  His US debut took place as Alfredo in Verdi's La traviata with Seattle Opera in the McCaw Hall opera house. In December 2009 " Lucia di Lammermoor" in Sassari.

In 2010 he appeared at Suntory Hall in Tokyo in Così fan tutte, sang in Lucia di Lammermoor in Hamburg, another La traviata and a Der Rosenkavalier in Dresden and also at the Wiener Staatsoper. He was featured as the poet Rodolfo in a La bohème in Detroit and at Wiener Staatsoper, in Maria Stuarda in Athens, another Elixir, and a new production of Rigoletto at Wiener Festwochen conducted by Omer Meir Wellber and directed by Luc Bondy.  The 2011 summer season saw a repeat of his Alfredo at Arena di Verona, where he received enthusiastic reviews. His debut at the Royal Opera House in Gianni Schicchi conducted by Antonio Pappano was a huge success, and that company invited him to return to sing another Alfredo.

Over the 2012/2013 period, he appeared in a variety of new roles, including Nemorino in Don Pasquale at the Théâtre des Champs-Élysées, in Macbeth in Munich, and in Falstaff at La Scala. In addition, he reprised some roles which included another Duke of Mantua for the San Francisco Opera, Alfredos for the Berlin Staatsoper, the Wiener Staatsoper, and the Oper Frankfurt, and as the poet Rodolfo for the Seattle Opera in February/March 2013.

Other appearances included those in Maria Stuarda staged by the ABAO-OLBE company in Bilbao in April 2013,  another Così in San Francisco in June 2013,  as Roméo in Roméo et Juliette in the Arena di Verona, and appearances as Fenton in San Francisco's October 2013 Falstaff came about.

2014 and beyond
Demuro appeared as the Duke of Mantua in January 2014 in Seattle, another Alfredo at the Opéra Bastille, as well as appearances with the Metropolitan Opera and Covent Garden.

References
Notes

Sources
 Biography on Seattle Opera's website
 Biography on the Russian National Orchestra's website
 Biographical information on IMG Artists' website

External links
 Demuro's Facebook page
Seattle Opera's website
Suntory Tokio Hall's website

1978 births
Italian operatic tenors
Living people
People from the Province of Sassari
21st-century Italian male  opera singers